Mathilda Batlayeri Airport (Indonesian: Bandar Udara Mathilda Batlayeri)  is an airport located in Amfutu, Tumbur Village, Wertamrian  district (near the town of Saumlaki), Tanimbar Islands Regency, Maluku, Indonesia. The airport replaced the old Olilit Airport to the south, which has fallen into disuse. The airport is named after Mathilda Batlayeri, a heroine originating from Tanimbar Islands who died at South Kalimantan in 1953 while fighting the Darul Islam rebel movement. Construction of the airport started in 2005. The airport began operation on 9 May 2014 after years of delay of construction of the airport. The airport currently can only accommodate airplanes up to the ATR-72, since the runway currently only has a length of 1.850 m. However, the government is planning to extend the runway to 2,500 m in 2019. The runway would also be widened to 45 m from the current 30 m <. This would allow the airport to accommodate larger aircraft such as the Boeing 737, Fokker 100 and the Airbus A320.

The airport currently has a single taxiway measuring 110 m x 15 m and an apron measuring 152 m x 75 m. The current terminal has an area measuring 1,440 m2. In the master plan, the airport terminal would be expanded to 4,000 m2 and on the next phase it would be expanded further to 7,000 m2. The airport's apron and taxiway would also be widened to accommodate larger aircraft.

Facilities
It has one runway with an unknown designation with an asphalt surface measuring 1.850 m x 30 m (5384 ft × 98 ft).

Airlines and destinations

The following destinations are served from Mathilda Batlayeri Airport:

Gallery

References

External links 
Mathilda Batlayeri Airport - Indonesia Airport Global Website

Airports in Maluku